Feng Donglai is a professor of Fudan University. He works on condensed matter physics.

Honors 
 2005, Javed Husain Prize
 2010, AAA, Robert T. Poe Prize

Selected papers 

 Evidence for ubiquitous strong electron–phonon coupling in high-temperature superconductors
 Photoemission Evidence for a Remnant Fermi Surface and a d-Wave-Like Dispersion in Insulating Ca2CuO2Cl2
 Signature of Superfluid Density in the Single-Particle Excitation Spectrum of Bi2Sr2CaCu2O8+δ
 Temperature-induced momentum-dependent spectral weight transfer in Bi2Sr2CaCu2O8+δ

References 

Living people
Academic staff of Fudan University
Chinese physicists
Year of birth missing (living people)